is an upcoming Japanese animated film directed by Ayataka Tanemura and produced by Pierrot. Based on the Black Clover manga series by Yūki Tabata, the film is set to be released in Japanese theaters and on Netflix internationally on June 16, 2023.

Plot
Asta, a boy born with no magic in a world where magic is everything, and his rival Yuno, a genius mage chosen by the legendary 4-leaf Grimoire, have together fought a number of powerful enemies to prove their power beyond adversity and aim for the top mage "Wizard King".

Standing in front of Asta and Yuno, who dream of becoming the Wizard King, are the Wizard Kings from the past.

Conrad Leto, Julius Novachrono's predecessor Wizard King, once respected by the people of Clover Kingdom but suddenly rebelled against the kingdom and was sealed away, has been resurrected. Now he aims to use the "Imperial Sword" to resurrect the 3 most feared Wizard Kings in the history, Edward Avalaché, Princia Funnybunny and Jester Garandaros, and take over the Clover Kingdom.

The boy who dreams of becoming the Wizard King vs The Wizard King from the past. An all-out war begins!

Voice cast

Production and release
An anime film adaptation of Black Clover was announced in Weekly Shōnen Jump in March 2021. On March 13, 2022, in the 15th Issue of Weekly Shōnen Jump, it was announced that the anime film will open in 2023 with Yūki Tabata serving as the chief supervisor and original character designer. In October 2022, it was announced that the film would feature a returning staff and cast from the television series, with Ayataka Tanemura directing, Pierrot producing the animation, Johnny Onda and Ai Orii writing the scripts, and Itsuko Takeda designing the characters. The film was initially set to be released simultaneously in Japanese theaters and on Netflix internationally on March 31, 2023, but was later postponed to June 16th of the same year due to the COVID-19 pandemic affecting its production.

Music
In October 2022, it was revealed that Minako Seki would be composing the music for the anime film. On December 17, 2022, at Shueisha's Jump Festa '23 event, a new trailer for the film was streamed on Shonen Jump's YouTube Channels with an English subtitled version being streamed on Netflix's YouTube channel. The short trailer revealed and previewed the theme song for the upcoming movie "Here I Stand" by Treasure.

Marketing
In March 2021, a key visual featuring Asta was released through the official Twitter account, with further details to be revealed at later date. In December 2021, at Shueisha's Jump Festa '22 event, a New Key visual for the anime film was released, this time featuring Yuno. In March 2022, short 30-second promotional video for the anime film was streamed on Jump Comic's official YouTube Channel.

On December 12, 2022, it was revealed that a bonus manga titled Volume 23.5: Sword of The Wizard King will be given to people attending the theatrical release of the film on the debut week. The bonus material will include character designs of the film's original characters that Yūki Tabata designed, a short novel by film writer Johnny Onda, and an interview with voice actors.

References

External links
  
 
 
 

2020s Japanese-language films
2023 anime films
2023 films
Anime films based on manga
Anime postponed due to the COVID-19 pandemic
Films postponed due to the COVID-19 pandemic
Japanese animated fantasy films
Japanese-language Netflix original films
Netflix original anime
Pierrot (company)
Upcoming films
Upcoming Netflix original films